Distel (German for "thistle") is a surname. Notable people with the surname include:

 Anne Distel (born 1947), French curator and art critic
 George Distel, American politician
 Dutch Distel (1896–1967), American baseball player
 Herbert Distel (born 1942), Swiss painter, sculptor, photographer, filmmaker and composer
 Marthe Distel, French journalist
 Sacha Distel (1933–2004), French singer and guitarist
 Galit Distel-Atbaryan, Israeli writer and politician

See also 

 Distel Zola (born 1989), French-Congolese football player

German-language surnames
Surnames from nicknames
German toponymic surnames